, better known as , is a Japanese comedian represented by Watanabe Entertainment. His wife is singer Akina.

Ōki was a member of the comedy duo Bibiru. He graduated from Kasukabe City Tanihara Junior High School and Seibudai Chiba Junior & Senior High School. Ōki is an ambassador for Kusakabe and Hagi Furusato. He is also the honorary curator of the John Manjirō Museum. Ōki is a special envoy for Kōchi Prefecture tourism.

Current appearances

TV series

Irregular appearances, specials

Radio series

Advertisements

Music videos

Dubbing
The Little Prince, the Conceited Man

Former appearances

TV series

Radio series

References

External links
 
 

Japanese comedians
1974 births
Living people
People from Saitama Prefecture